Washington Nunes Silva Junior (born 18 November 1962) is a Brazilian handball coach. He trained the Brazilian national team between 2016-2019.

References

1962 births
Living people
Brazilian sports coaches
Handball coaches
Handball coaches of international teams